Hafslo is a village in Luster Municipality in Vestland county, Norway. The lake Veitastrondvatnet is located to the northwest of Hafslo. The Norwegian County Road 55 runs through the village on its way from Sogndalsfjøra to Gaupne.

History
Historically, the village of Hafslo was the administrative centre of the municipality of Hafslo, which existed from 1838 until 1963.  Hafslo Church, located in the village of Hafslo, was the main church for the municipality, and it still is the main church for the Hafslo parish.

Name
The name comes from the old Hafslo farm, since Hafslo Church was located there.  The first element of the name comes from the old male name Hafr or from the word for "goat" (also hafr).  The second element of the name comes from the old word ló meaning "meadow", probably due to the excellent farming areas nearby.

Notable residents
 Sylfest Lomheim (born 1945) – Norwegian linguist
 Jens Sterri (born 1923) – civil servant
 Kjellfred Weum (born 1940) – hurdler

Media gallery

References

External links

Villages in Vestland
Luster, Norway